Zhang Yali (born 24 February 1964) is a female Chinese rower. She competed at 1988 Seoul Olympic Games. Together with her teammates, she won a bronze medal in the Eights.

References

Chinese female rowers
1964 births
Rowers at the 1988 Summer Olympics
Olympic rowers of China
Olympic bronze medalists for China
Living people
Olympic medalists in rowing
Medalists at the 1988 Summer Olympics
20th-century Chinese women
21st-century Chinese women